Lex Fridman (/'lɛks 'friːdmæn/; ,) is a Russian-American computer scientist, podcaster, and artificial intelligence researcher. He is a research scientist at the Massachusetts Institute of Technology, and he hosts the Lex Fridman Podcast, a podcast and YouTube series.

Early life 
Fridman is of Russian Jewish descent. His father is plasma physicist Alexander Fridman and his brother is Gregory Fridman CEO of AAP Plasma LLC.  His father was born in Chkalovsk, Russia, and serves as the John A. Nyheim Chair Professor and Director of the C. J. Nyheim Plasma Institute at Drexel University's College of Engineering. His maternal grandmother was born and raised in Kharkiv, and his maternal grandfather was a machine gunner in the Ukrainian branch of the Red Army against the Nazis during World War II.

In 1994, at the age of 11, Fridman moved to the U.S. with his family. He attended Neuqua Valley High School in Naperville, Illinois, graduating in 2001. He then went on to obtain BS and MS degrees in computer science at Drexel University in 2010, and completed his PhD in electrical and computer engineering at Drexel in 2014. His PhD dissertation, Learning of Identity from Behavioral Biometrics for Active Authentication, was completed under the advisement of engineering educators Moshe Kam and Steven Weber and sought to "investigate the problem of active authentication on desktop computers and mobile devices".

Career

Computer science
Fridman's career began at Google, where he worked on machine learning. He currently serves as a research scientist at MIT. In 2017, he worked on computer vision, deep learning, and planning algorithms for semi-autonomous vehicles.

Lex Fridman Podcast 
Fridman began his podcast in 2018, initially as part of the MIT course 6.S099 on artificial general intelligence. Its original title was the Artificial Intelligence Podcast, which was later changed to the Lex Fridman Podcast to reflect the wider range of topics it would address. Fridman uses the podcast to discuss "AI, science, technology, history, philosophy and the nature of intelligence, consciousness, love, and power". The podcast is structured as a long-form interview program. Interviews are conducted in-person, typically running two to four hours in length.
The podcast has featured musician Kanye West, chess grandmaster Magnus Carlsen, and businessmen Ray Dalio, Jack Dorsey, Elon Musk, and Mark Zuckerberg.

Personal life 
Fridman plays the guitar and piano. He also practices Brazilian jiu jitsu and holds a first-degree black belt under Phil Migliarese. He has competed in several grappling competitions, most notably in a match against Garry Tonon in 2013.

Select bibliography

References

External links 

 
 

American podcasters
American YouTubers
Russian podcasters
Russian YouTubers
American people of Russian descent
Russian Jews
American Jews
American people of Ukrainian-Jewish descent
Drexel University alumni
Living people
Russian emigrants to the United States
Russian computer scientists
Artificial intelligence researchers
Jewish American scientists
Massachusetts Institute of Technology faculty
Year of birth missing (living people)